Lauri Armas Nevalainen (24 January 1927 – 31 July 2005) was a Finnish rower who competed in the 1952 Summer Olympics.

He was born and died in Kotka.

In 1952 he was a crew member of the Finnish boat which won the bronze medal in the coxless fours event.

External links
 profile

1927 births
2005 deaths
Finnish male rowers
Olympic rowers of Finland
Rowers at the 1952 Summer Olympics
Olympic bronze medalists for Finland
Olympic medalists in rowing
Medalists at the 1952 Summer Olympics
People from Kotka
Sportspeople from Kymenlaakso